Hogna lupina, is a species of spider of the genus Hogna. It is endemic to Sri Lanka.

See also
 List of Lycosidae species

References

Lycosidae
Endemic fauna of Sri Lanka
Spiders of Asia
Spiders described in 1879